Mutungi is an African surname. Notable people with the surname include:

Irene Koki Mutungi (born 1976), Kenyan pilot 
Joseph Mutungi, Kenyan Anglican bishop
Onesmus Kimweli Mutungi (1940–2016), Kenyan judge and law professor

Surnames of African origin